Jayme Barcelos was a Brazilian football manager who managed the Brazil national football team for five international matches in 1940.

References

Brazilian football managers
Brazil national football team managers
Year of birth missing
Year of death missing
Place of birth missing
Place of death missing